Phyteuma scheuchzeri, the Oxford rampion or horned rampion, is a perennial herbaceous flowering plant in the family Campanulaceae.

Subspecies
 Phyteuma scheuchzeri columnae
 Phyteuma scheuchzeri scheuchzeri

Description
This plant form tufts of narrow, light bluish green leaves with tall stems holding little head-shaped inflorescence of deep-blue flowers. The bracts are lanceolate to linear and longer than the clusters.

Distribution
This species can be found in Southern Alps and in Northern Appennini, in Great Britain, Switzerland, France, Italy and former Yugoslavia.

Habitat
This species grows mostly in crevices on limestone and silicate rocks at altitudes of up to 3600 meters.

References

External links
 Perennials
 Dave’s Darden

Campanuloideae
Flora of Europe
Taxa named by Carlo Allioni